Gabriel Ramos may refer to:

 Gabriel Ramos (motorcyclist) (born 1994), Venezuelan motorcycle racer
 Gabriel Ramos (footballer) (born 1996), Brazilian footballer
 Gabriel Ramos (politician), American politician, member of the New Mexico Senate